Gregory McFaul (born 3 November 2000) is an Irish cricketer. He made his List A one-day debut for North West Warriors against Northern Knights in the 2019 Inter-Provincial Cup at Belfast.

References

External links
 

2000 births
Living people
Irish cricketers
North West Warriors cricketers
Sportspeople from Derry (city)